The Georgian Soviet Encyclopedia (ქსე) is the first universal encyclopedia in the Georgian language, printed in Tbilisi from 1965, the editor in chief of which was Irakli Abashidze. The encyclopedia consists of 11 alphabetic volumes and a 12th exclusively dedicated to the Georgian SSR, printed in both Georgian and Russian.

Sources 
 R. Metreveli, Georgian Soviet Encyclopedia, X, p. 483, Tbilisi, 1986

See also 
 Great Soviet Encyclopedia

National Soviet encyclopedias
Georgian Soviet Socialist Republic
Georgian-language encyclopedias
20th-century encyclopedias